Hyogo Prefectural Ashiya International Secondary School is a public, full-time, coeducational secondary school located in Hyogo prefect, Japan. The school motto is Respect, Integration, Contribution.

The students come from Australia, Austria, Brazil, Canada, China, Ecuador, Egypt, France, Germany, Iran, India, Italy, South Korea, North Korea, Mexico, New Zealand, Pakistan, Peru, Philippine, Russia, Singapore, Switzerland, U.K., US, and Vietnam."http://www.hyogo-c.ed.jp/~ashiyai-ss/">

History
 April 2003 - school founded and the first students enter. Former course classes start.
 March 2006 - first students finish former course.
 April 2006 - first students start latter course.
 March 2009 - first students graduate

Yearly intake
Yearly intake number 80
Details
30 children with foreign nationality
30 children who lived abroad over a year
20 children who understand the aim of the school

External links
Official website

Schools in Hyōgo Prefecture
Schools in Japan